Ketepa is a brand of tea in Kenya.

The name derives from Kenya Tea Packers. Ketepa is the largest tea company in Kenya, it has been making tea since 1978, and has its headquarters in Kericho but the law allowing Ketepa to export was only passed in 1992.

One advertising campaign seeks to turn "tea time" into "Ketepa time."

Ketepa won the Superbrands East Africa award in 2007.

References

Tea brands
Kenyan brands
Kenyan tea
Tea companies of Kenya